The 2006 Mexico DC-9 drug bust was a 2006 arrest that resulted in the seizure of 5.5 tons of cocaine in the Mexican city of Ciudad del Carmen. The drugs were smuggled into the country using a McDonnell Douglas DC-9-15. Both plane and drugs were seized by Mexican authorities; according to the United States Drug Enforcement Administration (DEA), it was one of the largest seizures of narcotics in recent Mexican history.

Drug seizure

The aircraft departed Simón Bolívar International Airport in Caracas, Venezuela on the afternoon of April 10, 2006. Approximately 90 minutes into the flight, it returned to the Caracas airport and refueled before resuming its flight. Rather than continue on its reported flight plan, however, the plane made an emergency landing at the Ciudad del Carmen airport, claiming hydraulic problems with the landing gear. Mexican army troops were waiting for the plane on its arrival. When they boarded the aircraft, they found 5.5 tons of cocaine packed into 128 identical black suitcases.

According to news reports, the pilot of the DC-9 escaped, but the co-pilot was arrested. In addition, the crew of a Mexican registered business jet attempting to make a rendezvous with the DC-9 at the airport was also arrested.

In 2007 the DEA claimed the seizure was one of Mexico's largest, referring to it as one of the highlights of a DEA program called "Operation All Inclusive".

Notes

2006 in Mexico
2006 in Venezuela
Illegal drug trade in Mexico
McDonnell Douglas DC-9
2006 crimes in Mexico